Shipyard, also called Shipyard Colony, is a Mennonite settlement that is also an administrative village in the Orange Walk District of Belize.

Shipyard was founded in 1958 by Old Colony Mennonites from Chihuahua and Durango states in Mexico. It consists of more than 20 camps (German: "dörfer"), which have German names like "Blumenort" or "Hochfeld", but outside the Mennonite community they are referred to only by numbers, e. g. "Camp 5" instead of "Reinfeld".

Most of the population of Shipyard are Plautdietsch-speaking ethnic Mennonites, living in a very integrated community where most of them work as carpenters, farmers and mechanics. Most Mennonites of Shipyard are quite traditional in lifestyle, still using horse and buggy for transportation and tractors with steel wheels for fieldwork. Compared with other Mennonites in Belize, Shipyard is more conservative than Spanish Lookout and Blue Creek, but more modern concerning the use of technology than Upper Barton Creek, Springfield and daughter colonies.

Population
Around 1960 the total population of Shipyard was 728. In 1987 it had grown to 1,966. In the 2014 census it had a total population of 3,497 people. In 2017 it has grown to 3,805 people. It is thus the largest Mennonite settlement in Belize.

See also 
Mennonites in Belize

External links 

 Global Anabaptist Mennonite Encyclopedia Online: Shipyard Colony (Belize)

References 

Mennonitism in Belize
Mexican Belizean
Old Colony Mennonites
Populated places in Orange Walk District
Ukrainian diaspora in North America
Russian Mennonite diaspora in Belize